The Kipling Society is a literary society open to everyone interested in the work and life of British author Rudyard Kipling (1865–1936). The Kipling Society focuses on Kipling and his place in English Literature, and as such attracts members from all over the world, both general readers and academic researchers.

The Society's activities include: regular meetings in the UK, a programme of lectures in London, and a formal Annual Luncheon with a distinguished guest speaker, as well as conferences. The Society publishes The Kipling Journal quarterly,  and hosts a comprehensive website, which includes a Readers’ Guide to Kipling’s works.  In addition, it runs an essay writing competition for schools, answers enquiries from the public (schools, publishers and writers), and works with the media. In 2014 it contributed to programmes commemorating the centenary of the First World War. The Society is a Registered Charity (No. 278885) and its activities are managed by a Council and run by the Secretary and honorary officers: The Hon. Secretary, Mike Kipling; Chair, Janet Montefiore; Deputy Chair, Angela Eyre; President, David Richards; Librarian, John Walker; Journal Editor, Janet Montefiore.

History and Aims
Founded in 1927 while Kipling was still alive, the society is one of the oldest and most enduring literary societies.
The Kipling Society was founded by J H C Brooking and a few fellow enthusiasts, including Kipling's school-friends Major General L C Dunsterville and G C Beresford, who featured in Stalky & Co. as "Stalky" and "M'Turk". Its aims are to promote interest in the works, life and times of Rudyard Kipling and to act as a physical and virtual meeting place for all those interested in him; to make the archive of existing knowledge accessible through its library and website; to foster new research and to support scholarly editions of previously unpublished work.

Membership and Meetings
Membership is open to anyone with an interest in the life and works of Rudyard Kipling. Members receive a copy of the quarterly Kipling Journal, and have access to the Society's regular meetings, and to the Members’ pages of the Society's web-site. The Society holds five meetings a year in central London, providing lectures and discussions on a range of Kipling-related topics. Meetings and seminars are also held in other parts of Britain from time to time.

The Kipling Journal
The Kipling Journal is sent quarterly to all members of the Kipling Society and from January 2015 is peer-reviewed. It includes articles, membership news, Society events, and the texts of talks given by invited speakers. Every issue of the journal is available online via the website except articles published within two years of the current date.

Conferences
The Society organises conferences in partnership with academic institutions. These have attracted international scholars and been significant in developing thinking about Kipling's work.

Kipling in America, 1892–1896 was held at Marlboro College, Vermont, on 7 October 2013. This symposium on Kipling's four years in Brattleboro, Vermont after his marriage to the American Caroline Balestier, focused on the influence of Kipling's time in America on his work.

Rudyard Kipling: an international writer was hosted by the Institute of English Studies at University of London in October 2011. This coincided with the launch of The Cambridge Companion to Kipling and many of its contributors were also speakers.

The Kent Conference was held at the University of Kent in September 2007. The conference was organised to mark the centenary of Kipling's Nobel Prize for Literature. It was directed by Dr Jan Montefiore and sponsored by the Kipling Society.

Post-Colonial Kipling was held at Magdalene College, Cambridge University in September 2001, a century after the publication of Kim. There were four major themes, Kipling: a post-colonial assessment, Kipling and women, Kipling and film, and Kipling in translation.

The Kipling Library
The Society maintains a research library of over 1,300 items which can be consulted by members. Kipling’s works were published in a variety of different editions during his lifetime and many of these are owned by the library. It holds a complete set of the Sussex Edition, the most complete single collection of Kipling’s works, which he edited before his death in 1936, and the Cambridge Edition of his verse, the most comprehensive collection of his poetry, edited by Thomas Pinney and published in 2013. The library contains biographies, collections of press cuttings, photographs and relevant memorabilia, critical studies and a growing set of translations of Kipling's works in other languages.  Until June 2014, the Library was housed at City University, London. Most of the collection is now at Haileybury College, Kipling's old school, with some items being held at Sussex University.

The Society's Website
The Society's website is a source of information about Kipling's life and works, including a number of his short stories and articles not published elsewhere. In addition, it offers a range of research tools, guides and back-issues of The Kipling Journal. The website also includes the Readers' Guide, providing introductions and notes to accompany each story, article, and poem.

The John Slater Memorial Kipling Essay Prize
The John Slater Memorial Kipling Essay Prize is awarded annually for the winning essay by a Sixth Form student, on selected works by Rudyard Kipling. The prize is £750 (£250 for the student and £500 for the school or college).

The Rudyard Kipling Mailbase
A Rudyard Kipling discussion forum enables any member of the 'Rudyard-Kipling' mailbase to exchange messages by email with everyone else on the list globally.

Bateman's
Bateman's was Rudyard Kipling's House at Burwash in Sussex for over thirty years. It is now a National Trust property and there are close connections with the Kipling Society and a Bateman's liaison officer keeps members informed of events and developments.

References

External links
 Official website
 The Kipling Journal 
 Kipling JISC Mailbase 
 Bateman's National Trust Property
 Haileybury School
 Sussex University

1927 establishments in England
Charities based in Essex
Literary societies
Arts organizations established in 1927
Rudyard Kipling